Introduction and Allegro may refer to:

 Introduction and Allegro (Elgar)
 Introduction and Allegro (Ravel)
 Introduction and Allegro appassionato (Schumann)